Russian male artistic gymnasts have competed at every Olympic Games since 1996. In total, there have been 29 Russian male gymnasts who have competed at the Olympics.

Gymnasts

Note: The following only counts medals won by gymnasts when they represented Russia or the Russian Olympic Committee (Not the Unified Team or the Soviet Union). Example: Aleksey Voropayev won a gold medal with the Unified Team in 1992, but only the gold medal he won in 1996 appears here.

Medalists

See also
 List of Olympic female artistic gymnasts for Russia

References

gymnasts
Russia